Fechenheim is a quarter of Frankfurt am Main, Germany. It is part of the Ortsbezirk Ost and is subdivided into the Stadtbezirke Fechenheim-Nord and Fechenheim-Süd.

References

Districts of Frankfurt